Darwin Bond (born August 17, 1951) is an American retired sprinter. He was an eight-time All-American at the University of Tennessee.

References

1951 births
Living people
American male sprinters
Place of birth missing (living people)
Universiade medalists in athletics (track and field)
Universiade gold medalists for the United States
Medalists at the 1973 Summer Universiade